The 1997 UCI Track Cycling World Championships were the World Championship for track cycling. They took place in Perth, Western Australia from 27 to 31 August 1997. Twelve events were contested, eight for the men and four for the women. France dominated most of the events, taking home half of the gold medals on offer.

Medal table

Medal summary

External links
Official event website
UCI website
1997 reports and results at cycclingnews.com

Uci Track Cycling World Championships, 1997
Track cycling
UCI Track Cycling World Championships by year
International cycle races hosted by Australia
Sport in Perth, Western Australia
August 1997 sports events in Australia